Moqanak or Miqanak or Mowkanak or Mukanak or Muqanak or Maghaunak may refer to:

Moqanak, Qazvin
Moqanak, Tehran

See also
Moghanak (disambiguation)